Echinoclathria is a genus of demosponge in the family Microcionidae.

Species
Species in the genus include:
 Echinoclathria arborea (Tanita, 1968)
 Echinoclathria arcifera (Schmidt, 1880)
 Echinoclathria atlantica Sarà, 1978
 Echinoclathria axinelloides (Dendy, 1896)
 Echinoclathria bergquistae Hooper, 1996
 Echinoclathria beringensis (Hentschel, 1929)
 Echinoclathria chalinoides (Carter, 1885)
 Echinoclathria confragosa (Hallmann, 1912)
 Echinoclathria contexta Sarà, 1978
 Echinoclathria dichotoma (Lévi, 1963)
 Echinoclathria digitata (Lendenfeld, 1888)
 Echinoclathria digitiformis (Row, 1911)
 Echinoclathria egena Wiedenmayer, 1989
 Echinoclathria gibbosa (Keller, 1889)
 Echinoclathria inornata (Hallmann, 1912)
 Echinoclathria leporina (Lamarck, 1814)
 Echinoclathria levii Hooper, 1996
 Echinoclathria minor (Burton, 1959)
 Echinoclathria nodosa Carter, 1885
 Echinoclathria notialis Hooper, 1996
 Echinoclathria noto (Tanita, 1963)
 Echinoclathria oxeata (Bergquist & Fromont, 1988)
 Echinoclathria parkeri Hooper, 1996
 Echinoclathria retepora (Lendenfeld, 1887)
 Echinoclathria reticulata (Bergquist & Fromont, 1988)
 Echinoclathria riddlei Hooper, 1996
 Echinoclathria rimosa (Ridley, 1884)
 Echinoclathria robusta (Keller, 1889)
 Echinoclathria subhispida Carter, 1885
 Echinoclathria translata (Pulitzer-Finali, 1978)
 Echinoclathria vasa Lehnert, Stone & Heimler, 2006
 Echinoclathria waldoschmitti de Laubenfels, 1954

References

Poecilosclerida
Taxa named by Henry John Carter